William John Rose (7 August 1885 – 10 March 1968) was a Canadian slavist and historian. He served as the director of the School of Slavonic and East European Studies from 1945 to 1947.

References

Further reading 
Stone, D "The Polish memoirs of William John Rose" (Toronto, 1975)
"Slavonic and East European Review" vol 47, no 108, 1969, pp 8–10.

1885 births
1968 deaths
Academics of the UCL School of Slavonic and East European Studies
Slavists
Canadian Rhodes Scholars
Writers from Manitoba
20th-century Canadian historians
YMCA leaders